Peter Allen Stauber (born May 10, 1966) is an American politician, former professional hockey player, and retired law enforcement officer from Minnesota serving as the United States representative for Minnesota's 8th congressional district. A member of the Republican Party, Stauber has represented the district since 2019.

Stauber was born and grew up in Duluth, Minnesota. He played college hockey for Lake Superior State University, where as a star player on the team, he led the Lakers to a national championship in the 1988 NCAA Division I Men's Ice Hockey Tournament. Stauber met his political idol President Ronald Reagan when the team visited the White House after winning the national championship. He later said this event formed his political ambition. He went on to have a brief career in professional hockey. Stauber served as a lieutenant in the Duluth Police Department from 1995 to 2017. During his service as a police officer, he was shot while on duty. He also served as a county commissioner in St. Louis County, Minnesota, from 2013 to 2019.

Stauber succeeded DFL incumbent Rick Nolan by defeating Democratic nominee Joe Radinovich in the 2018 United States House of Representatives elections.

Representing a working-class and mostly rural district, Stauber is only the second Republican to represent his district since 1947.

Early life and education
Stauber was born on May 10, 1966, in Duluth, Minnesota, and attended Denfeld High School in Duluth. He has a bachelor's degree in criminology from Lake Superior State University, where he was a star player on the Lake Superior State Lakers men's ice hockey team. He is credited with helping lead the Lakers to victory in the playoffs and the 1988 NCAA Division I Men's Ice Hockey Championship game. Lake Superior "became the smallest school ever to win college hockey's biggest prize." In that game, Stauber took a critical shot, described by opinion columnist Mike Mullen during Stauber's 2018 candidacy for the U.S. House of Representatives as "risky, arguably crafty, and inarguably illegal," and by Star Tribune sportswriter John Gilbert in his 1988 story on the championship game as the moment when "Pete Stauber got away undetected when he straight-armed the net off its moorings during a Saints rush with 1:23 to go in regulation."

After winning the national championship, the team was invited to the White House, where Stauber met President Ronald Reagan, an event he has called a pivotal moment in the formation of his interest in politics.

Career

Professional hockey 
In 1990, Stauber signed a multi-year contract with the Detroit Red Wings. The Florida Panthers selected him from the Red Wings in the 1993 NHL Expansion Draft.

Stauber and his brothers, John, Jamie, Bill, Dan, and Robb, all played hockey. Together they run an annual Stauber Brothers Military Heroes Hockey Camp, a summer program for children with parents in the military. The six are co-owners of the Duluth Hockey Company, which began as a sporting goods retailer but since 2015 has specialized in hockey-related merchandise.

Local politics
Stauber served on the Hermantown City Council for eight years. From 2013 to 2019, he served as a member of the St. Louis County, Minnesota Commission, which includes Duluth.

Political positions

Indigenous issues
A group of Ojibwe tribes from Stauber's district rebuked him for his attempts to block President Joe Biden's nomination of Deb Haaland as United States Secretary of the Interior. The Midwest Alliance of Sovereign Tribes also complained about his actions. A member of the House subcommittee on Indigenous Peoples, Stauber cited Haaland's support of the Green New Deal and opposition to oil drilling. As a member of the House, he did not vote on the nomination.

U.S. House of Representatives

Elections

2018 

In June 2018, Donald Trump campaigned for Stauber in his run for U.S. Representative, making his first visit to Minnesota as president and attending his first rally to support a Republican candidate for the House of Representatives in the 2018 general election, visiting Stauber's hometown of Duluth.

The 8th district had an open seat in a previously Democratic-Farmer-Labor (DFL)-held district where the last two elections were close. Partisan funders on both sides of the aisle reserved "millions" of dollars for advertising in a race widely regarded as a potential Republican pickup of a seat that had been held since 2013 by Rick Nolan. In November, Stauber defeated the DFL nominee, former Nolan aide Joe Radinovich, to become only the fifth person to represent the district in 71 years, and the second Republican to do so. He won primarily by running up his margins in the district's more conservative western portion.

During his 2018 campaign, Stauber ran on a policy of allowing Medicare to negotiate drug prices, becoming only one of a handful of Republicans to endorse what was primarily a progressive idea. Stauber has since walked back from his campaign pledge.

2020 

Stauber was reelected on November 4, 2020, defeating DFL nominee Quinn Nystrom. In December 2020, he filed a motion to support Texas v. Pennsylvania, described as a "seditious abuse of the judicial process" and aimed at invalidating millions of votes in various swing states. The Duluth News Tribune, which had endorsed Stauber, and many other local officials sharply criticized him for the ploy in an open letter to Stauber.

Tenure 
According to the McCourt School of Public Policy at Georgetown University, Stauber held a Bipartisan Index Score of 0.7 in the 116th United States Congress for 2019, which placed him 64th out of 435 members. Based on FiveThirtyEight's congressional vote tracker at ABC News, Stauber voted with Trump's stated public policy positions 90.4% of the time, which ranked him average in the 116th United States Congress when predictive scoring (district partisanship and voting record) is used.

On September 30, 2020, Stauber hosted Trump in a visit to his district, attending a rally of about 3,000 people at the Duluth International Airport. Along with two of his Minnesota Republican House colleagues, Stauber rode with Trump on Air Force One. After it was determined that Stauber had interacted with people who tested positive for COVID-19 in Washington D.C., including Trump, Stauber took a Delta flight in violation of Delta's rules, potentially exposing the other passengers to the virus.

In December 2020, Stauber was one of 126 Republican members of the House of Representatives to sign an amicus brief in support of Texas v. Pennsylvania, a lawsuit filed at the United States Supreme Court contesting the results of the 2020 presidential election, in which Joe Biden defeated incumbent Donald Trump.

Committee assignments 
House Committee on Transportation and Infrastructure
Subcommittee on Highways and Transit
Subcommittee on Railroads, Pipelines, and Hazardous Materials
Subcommittee on Aviation
Committee on Small Business
Subcommittee on Contracting and Workforce (Ranking Member)
Subcommittee on Economic Growth, Tax and Capital Access

Caucus memberships 
Law Enforcement Caucus
Congressional Steel Caucus
Congressional Western Caucus
Congressional Sportsmen's Foundation
Republican Main Street Partnership 
Republican Study Committee
 Republican Governance Group  
Problem Solvers Caucus (former)

Electoral history

Personal life
Of German ancestry, Stauber lives in Hermantown, where he and his family belong to the St. Lawrence Catholic Church. While on police duty in 1995, he was shot and lightly wounded in the head when a bullet entered his squad car.

References

External links
Congressman Pete Stauber official U.S. House website
Campaign website

|-

1966 births
Adirondack Red Wings players
American men's ice hockey forwards
American Roman Catholics
American shooting survivors
Catholics from Minnesota
Candidates in the 2018 United States elections
County commissioners in Minnesota
Lake Superior State University alumni
Living people
Minnesota city council members
Politicians from Duluth, Minnesota
Republican Party members of the United States House of Representatives from Minnesota
Toledo Storm players
American police officers
21st-century American politicians
NCAA men's ice hockey national champions